Sir Henry Urmston Willink, 1st Baronet,  (7 March 1894 – 20 July 1973) was a British politician and public servant. A Conservative Member of Parliament from 1940, he became Minister of Health in 1943. During his time in power he was appointed Special Commissioner for those made homeless by the London Blitz and was involved with the production of the Beveridge Report.

The details of the report proposed a comprehensive free healthcare system, this led to the white paper 'A National Health Service''', published in 1944, suggesting the creation of such a service, which did not include the nationalisation of hospitals. Such a policy was later implemented by the Labour Party through the creation of the National Health Service which differed from the proposals suggested by Willink. At the time he claimed the nationalisation of voluntary hospitals "will destroy so much in this country that we value".

 Early life and wartime service 
Willink was born in Liverpool. He was educated as a King's Scholar at Eton College, where he won the Newcastle Scholarship in 1912, and at Trinity College, Cambridge. Before he could take his Cambridge degree, he volunteered for service in the Royal Field Artillery during the First World War. When aged only 22, Willink commanded a battery at the 1916 Battle of the Somme. Willink received the Military Cross and the Croix de Guerre. Post-war, he was called to the Bar by the Inner Temple in 1920, was appointed to the rank of King's Counsel in 1935 and became a Bencher in 1942.

 Political career 

Willink was elected as Member of Parliament (MP) for Croydon North in a wartime by-election on 19 June 1940. There was only one other candidate, an independent, who received a very small vote. In 1940, he was appointed Special Commissioner for the homeless in London.

Willink was made a Privy Counsellor in 1943, the year he became Minister of Health, a role in which he served until the Conservatives lost the 1945 general election. Willink, with John Hawton, was responsible for the 1944 White Paper, following the Beveridge Report, called A National Health Service''. It proposed the creation of a fully comprehensive, universal healthcare system, free of charge and available to all citizens irrespective of means.

When Labour came into office in 1945, it presented its own plan in preference to Willink's, which it had supported. The principal difference was that Willink's plan talked of a "publicly organised" rather than a "publicly provided" service, and Labour's plan brought hospitals into full national ownership. Willink's successor Nye Bevan, however, made concessions to General practitioners.

Willink kept his seat at the 1945 general election by just 607 votes over Labour's Marion Billson. Turnout was low and there were rumours of sacks of servicemen's votes left uncounted in the Town Hall basement. Labour's David Rees-Williams - later Baron Ogmore - had taken the other Croydon seat.

Willink resigned from Parliament on 29 January 1948, and the subsequent by-election was won resoundingly by Conservative Fred Harris, with a majority of almost 12,000 votes, despite a ballot of high-profile candidates.

Public service 

Willink continued to serve in public positions. In 1948, he was appointed Master of Magdalene College, Cambridge, a post he held until 1966. From 1953 until 1955 he was also Vice-Chancellor of the University of Cambridge. He chaired the steering committee leading to the formation of the Royal College of General Practitioners, starting in 1952. Willink later described his role as Chairman of that Steering Committee as "one of the very best projects with which I have ever been involved in my life."

In 1957 Willink served as Chairman of the Inter-Departmental Committee on the Future Numbers of Medical Practitioners and Intakes of Medical Students. The committee concluded that too many doctors were being trained and proposed a 12% reduction. That was soon realised to be a misjudgement. From 1955 to 1971, he held the office of Dean of Arches, the senior ecclesiastical judge of England.

He was made a baronet, of Dingle Bank in the City of Liverpool, in 1957, and was awarded an honorary LLD by the University of Melbourne in 1955. His papers are held at Churchill College, Cambridge.

Arms

References

Papers of Sir Henry Willink
Portrait of Willink in the National Portrait Gallery, London.

External links 
 

1894 births
1973 deaths
Alumni of Trinity College, Cambridge
Baronets in the Baronetage of the United Kingdom
British Army personnel of World War I
Conservative Party (UK) MPs for English constituencies
Fellows of Magdalene College, Cambridge
Masters of Magdalene College, Cambridge
Members of the Privy Council of the United Kingdom
Ministers in the Churchill wartime government, 1940–1945
Politicians from Liverpool
Politics of the London Borough of Croydon
20th-century King's Counsel
Recipients of the Military Cross
Royal Field Artillery officers
UK MPs 1935–1945
UK MPs 1945–1950
Vice-Chancellors of the University of Cambridge
Ministers in the Churchill caretaker government, 1945
Recipients of the Croix de Guerre 1914–1918 (France)
People educated at Eton College
English barristers